Podłęcze may refer to the following places:
Podłęcze, Łódź Voivodeship (central Poland)
Podłęcze, Masovian Voivodeship (east-central Poland)
Podłęcze, Gryfice County in West Pomeranian Voivodeship (north-west Poland)
Podłęcze, Stargard County in West Pomeranian Voivodeship (north-west Poland)